Markus Phillips (born 21 March 1999) is a Canadian ice hockey defenceman who currently plays for Porin Ässät of the Liiga. He previously played for the Manitoba Moose and the Ontario Reign of the American Hockey League. He is a Los Angeles Kings draft pick from the 2017 NHL Entry Draft.

Career 
On 21 March 2022, Markus Phillips got traded to the Winnipeg Jets organization in exchange for Nelson Nogier.

On 5 August 2022, confirmation of Phillips signing a one-year contract to Porin Ässät was accidentally published before it was supposed to.

References 

Ässät players
1999 births
Canadian ice hockey defencemen
Living people